The Tuira Formation is a geologic formation in Panama. It preserves bivalve, gastropod and sponge fossils dating back to the Tortonian period (Clarendonian to Hemphillian in the NALMA classification), from 11 to 9.5 Ma.

Fossil content 
Among others, the following fossils have been reported from the formation:
 Monoplex panamensis
 Umbrina opima
 Ogilbichthys dariensis

See also 
 List of fossiliferous stratigraphic units in Panama

References

Bibliography 
 
 
 

Geologic formations of Panama
Miocene Series of North America
Miocene Series of South America
Neogene Panama
Tortonian
Clarendonian
Hemphillian
Mayoan
Paleontology in Panama
Shallow marine deposits
Formations